The 2013 Junior World Weightlifting Championships were held in Lima, Peru from 3 to 10 May 2013.

Medal summary

Men

Women

Medal table
Ranking by Big (Total result) medals

Ranking by all medals: Big (Total result) and Small (Snatch and Clean & Jerk)

References

External links
IWF
Results Book (24 August 2013)

IWF Junior World Weightlifting Championships
Junior World Weightlifting Championships
Junior World Weightlifting Championships
Weightlifting
Sports competitions in Lima